Rodolfo Hontiveros Gabriel II (born July 1, 1986), popularly known as Precious Paula Nicole, is a Filipino drag performer. She is best known for winning the inaugural season of Drag Race Philippines. She performs at O Bar and has impersonated Beyoncé, Mariah Carey, and Regine Velasquez. She is slated to appear at RuPaul's DragCon UK in 2023.

Personal life 
Gabriel was born in Daet, Camarines Norte, Philippines as Rodolfo Hontiveros Gabriel II.

Gabriel is bisexual, and uses "the pronoun 'he' out of drag and 'she' when she's on stage".

Filmography

Television

References 

Living people
Drag Race (franchise) winners
Drag Race Philippines
Filipino drag queens
Bisexual artists
1986 births